Pelikán má alibi is a 1940 Czechoslovak criminal comedy film, directed by Miroslav Cikán. It stars  Miroslav Homola, Marie Glázrová, Jaroslav Marvan.

References

External links
Pelikán má alibi at the Internet Movie Database

1940 films
Films directed by Miroslav Cikán
1940s crime comedy films
Czechoslovak crime comedy films
Czechoslovak black-and-white films
Czech crime comedy films
1940 comedy films
1940s Czech films